Liberty Courthouse Square Historic District is a national historic district located at Liberty, Union County, Indiana.  The district encompasses 20 contributing buildings and 2 contributing objects in the central business district of Liberty and centered on the separately listed Union County Courthouse.  It developed between about 1854 and 1938 and includes representative examples of Italianate, Romanesque Revival, Neoclassical, and Art Deco style architecture. Notable contributing buildings include the O'Toole Building (1936), Masonic Hall (c. 1860), Odd Fellows Building (c. 1854), Liberty Opera House (c. 1878), and Liberty Post Office (1937-1938).

It was listed on the National Register of Historic Places in 2013.

See also
Liberty Residential Historic District

References

Historic districts on the National Register of Historic Places in Indiana
Italianate architecture in Indiana
Romanesque Revival architecture in Indiana
Neoclassical architecture in Indiana
Art Deco architecture in Indiana
Historic districts in Union County, Indiana
National Register of Historic Places in Union County, Indiana
Courthouses on the National Register of Historic Places in Indiana